Thomas Eriksson (born October 7, 1959 in Borlänge, Dalarna) is a Swedish cross-country skier who competed from 1982 to 1997. He won a complete set of medals at the FIS Nordic World Ski Championships with a gold in the 30 km (1982), a silver in the 4 × 10 km relay (1991), and a bronze in the 4 × 10 km relay (1985).

Cross-country skiing results
All results are sourced from the International Ski Federation (FIS).

Olympic Games

World Championships
 3 medals – (1 gold, 1 silver, 1 bronze)

World Cup

Season standings

Individual podiums
 2 victories 
 5 podiums

Team podiums
 5 victories 
 9 podiums 

Note:  Until the 1999 World Championships, World Championship races were included in the World Cup scoring system.

References

External links

1959 births
Living people
People from Borlänge Municipality
Cross-country skiers from Dalarna County
Swedish male cross-country skiers
Olympic cross-country skiers of Sweden
Cross-country skiers at the 1980 Winter Olympics
FIS Nordic World Ski Championships medalists in cross-country skiing